The title of Governor of the Isle of Man existed until 1828. Other titles were also used, especially before 1595.

Holan (1219–?), titled Seneschal
List incomplete
Fogall McHascatt (1260–?), titled Seneschal
Godfrey MacManus (1266–?), titled Bailiff
Alan of Galloway, titled Bailiff
Maurice Okerfair, titled Bailiff
Reginald the Chaplain, titled Bailiff
Brennus, titled Bailiff
Donald, titled Bailiff
Walter de Huntercombe (1290–93), titled Custodian
List incomplete

The following were Governors of the Isle of Man:

Sir Thomas Gerrard (1595–1596)
Peter Legh (captain; 1596-?)
John Ireland
John Greenhalgh (1640–51)
William Christian (1656–?)
James Chaloner (1658–1660)
Lord Fairfax (1660)
Thomas Cobbe?
Isaac Barrow (1664–?)
Nicholas Stanley (1696–1701)
Charles Zedenno Stanley (1702–1703)
Robert Mawdesley (1703–1713)
Charles Zedenno Stanley (1713)
Alexander Horne (1713–1723)
John Lloyd (1723–1725)
Thomas Horton (1725–1736)
James Murray, 2nd Duke of Atholl (1736–1744)
Patrick Lindsay (1744–1751)
Basil Cochrane (1751–1761)
John Wood (1761–1777)
Edward Smith (1777–1793)
John Murray, 4th Duke of Atholl (1793–1828)

References

See also

Lieutenant Governor of the Isle of Man
King of Mann
Lord of Mann

Isle of Man
Government of the Isle of Man
 
History of the Isle of Man
Governors
Isle of Man

fr:Liste des dirigeants de l'île de Man#Gouverneurs de l'île de Man